Ruslan Gritsan (born 7 December 1978, in Moscow) is a Russian competitor and multiple world champion in both ski-orienteering and mountain bike orienteering.

Ski orienteering career
At the 1998 Junior World Ski Orienteering Championships Grislan won gold medals in both the classic distance and the short distance.

He won a gold medal in the short distance at the 2005 World Ski Orienteering Championships in Levi, shared with Andrei Gruzdev. He won gold medals in the relay with the Russian team in 2002, 2004 and 2005. In 2002 the Russian team consisted of Andrei Gruzdev, Gristan, Viktor Korchagin and Eduard Khrennikov, and the team won gold ahead of Finland.  The 2004 team consisted of Vasily Glukharev, Andrei Gruzdev, Gritsan and Eduard Khrennikov, winning ahead of the Norwegian team.  In 2005 Gruzdev, Gritsan and Khrennikov won the relay ahead of Finland.

Mountain bike orienteering career
At the 2004 World MTB Orienteering Championships in Ballarat Gritslan placed tenth in the middle, 32nd in the long, and sixth in the relay. At the 2005 World Championships in Banska Bystrica he won a gold medal in the middle distance, a gold medal in the long distance, and placed fourth with the Russian relay team. At the 2006 Championships in Joensuu he won a bronze medal in the middle distance, a silver medal in the long distance, and a silver medal in the relay with the Russian team, behind Finland. At the 2007 World MTB Orienteering Championships in Nove Mesto na Morave he won a gold medal in the long distance, placed fourth in the sprint, 57th in the middle distance, and fourth in the relay. At the 2008 World MTB Orienteering Championships in Ostróda, he won a gold medal in the long distance and a silver medal in the relay. In Ben Shemen in 2009 he won a silver medal in the long distance, a bronze medal in the sprint, and a gold medal in the relay. At the 2010 World Championships in Montalegre he won a gold medal with the Russian relay team, together with Valeriy Gluhov and Anton Foliforov. He placed fourth in the middle distance, and tenth in the long distance.

References

1978 births
Living people
Russian orienteers
Male orienteers
Mountain bike orienteers
Ski-orienteers
21st-century Russian people